Tara VanFlower is an American singer-songwriter, known for her vocal contributions to darkwave group Lycia. In 1999 she released This Womb Like Liquid Honey on Projekt Records. She released a second album titled My Little Fire-Filled Heart  in 2005 by Silber Records.

Discography 
Studio albums
 This Womb Like Liquid Honey (1999, Projekt)
 My Little Fire-Filled Heart (2005, Silber)

Extended plays
 Beneath the Moon (2006, Hand/Eye)

References

External links 
 
 
 
 
 

American rock singers
Dark wave musicians
Gothic rock musicians
Living people
Musicians from Mesa, Arizona
21st-century American singers
Year of birth missing (living people)
21st-century American women singers